Dissect is a music podcast that debuted in 2016 and is hosted by Cole Cuchna. The podcast is known for its thorough analysis of contemporary music. Dissect was named "Best podcast of 2017" by Quartz, and the following year was named "Best podcast of 2018" by The New York Times and both Time magazine and The Guardian listed Dissect as one of the top 50 podcasts of 2018.

Content 
Cuchna has a degree in music composition and approaches the analysis of contemporary music the way he has with classical music. From Season 3 onwards, the podcast is produced by Spotify.

Seasons

Mini-series 
Dissect "mini-series" have similar content to normal seasons, but in a shorter format.

Format 
An episode of Dissect is typically between 30 and 60 minutes. Episodes are usually structured with a short description of the podcast, a recap of the previous episode's conclusion, a listing of the songs credits, and a long-form analysis of the song. Audio samples from music that influenced the song are often included in the initial credits, and song recreations are interspersed throughout the analysis.

Free episodes are released twice-weekly during a season's production and are made available via SoundCloud, Spotify, and iTunes, among other services. The first two seasons were supported via Patreon donations but has since switched to advertising. Cuchna selects a different charity to support for each season through listener donations.

Awards

History 
Cuchna graduated from California State University with a degree in music composition, and felt that contemporary music—specifically hip hop—was not receiving the academic analysis it deserved. The podcast debuted in August 2016 with Cuchna as the sole creator of the podcast, which he recorded at night after working a full-time job at a specialty coffee roasting company once his wife and kids had gone to sleep. In 2018, Cuchna began working with Spotify to produce the podcast.

Episode list

See also 
 Music podcast
 List of music podcasts

References

External links 

Audio podcasts
2016 podcast debuts
Music podcasts